The 31st Texas Cavalry Regiment was a unit of mounted volunteers from Texas that fought in the Confederate States Army during the American Civil War. Trevezant C. Hawpe organized the regiment in early 1862 with recruits mostly from Dallas County, Texas, and surroundings. In June 1862, it marched to Arkansas where it joined a brigade led by Douglas H. Cooper. The unit fought at Newtonia and McGuire's Store in autumn 1862 and subsequently dismounted to serve as infantry. The regiment served at Prairie  Grove in December 1862. It moved to Louisiana in February 1863 at which time Hawpe resigned. The unit helped defeat a Federal force at Stirling's Plantation in September 1863. The following month it joined a brigade led by Camille de Polignac. In 1864 the regiment fought at Mansfield, Pleasant Hill, and Yellow Bayou during the Red River Campaign. In March 1865 the regiment marched to Texas where it disbanded in May.

See also
List of Texas Civil War Confederate units

Notes

References

Units and formations of the Confederate States Army from Texas
1862 establishments in Texas
1865 disestablishments in Texas
Military units and formations disestablished in 1865
Military units and formations established in 1862